The Yilan Distillery Chia Chi Lan Liquor Museum or Chia Chi Lan Liquor Museum is a museum about wine in Yilan City, Yilan County, Taiwan.

History
The museum building was originally built in 1935.

Architecture
The museum building is a two-story house in Japanese style.

Exhibition
The museum houses the display of wine cultures, such as wine manufacturing process and the chronicle for both Taiwan Tobacco and Liquor Monopoly Bureau and Yilan Distillery throughout history.

Transportation
The museum is accessible within walking distance west from Yilan Station of the Taiwan Railways Administration.

See also
 List of museums in Taiwan
 Wine Museum

References

1935 establishments in Taiwan
Food museums in Taiwan
Museums established in 1998
Museums in Yilan County, Taiwan
Wine museums
Taiwanese wine